Dr. M. K. Rajakumar (25 May 1932 – 22 November 2008) was a Malaysian doctor and socialist politician. As a doctor, he was a pioneer of the discipline of Family Medicine by general practitioners in Malaysia. As a leftist intellectual he was among the leaders of the Labour Party of Malaya and Barisan Sosialis in the 1960s, helping to build the Labour Party alongside Tan Chee Khoon, V. David and Ishak Haji Muhammad (better known as Pak Sako).

Early life and political activities
In the 1950s, while studying medicine at the Singapore campus of the University of Malaya, Rajakumar was active in the University Socialist Club,  where he met historian Khoo Khay Kim and former Parti Sosialis Rakyat Malaysia president Kassim Ahmad, who were also students. Rajakumar, then 22 years old, was involved with the editorial board of Fajar, the Socialist Club's newspaper. The team behind the newsletter were soon accused of sedition and prosecuted. Rajakumar and the Fajar board were defended by the radical British QC Denis Pritt, with Lee Kuan Yew (later the first Prime Minister of Singapore) as junior counsel.

Rajakumar graduated from the University of Malaya in 1956, and went on to become chairman of the Selangor Labour Party. He was detained under the Internal Security Act from 1966 to 1969. His political influence waned after the decline of the Barisan Socialis in the late 60s.

Medical career

Intern – Malacca General Hospital, 1956–57

Medical Officer – Malacca General Hospital, 1957–60

In charge of : Outpatient Department, Drug Addiction Ward, Blood Transfusion Services

Postings : Gynecological Ward, Obstetrics Unit, Surgical Unit, Visiting District Clinics, Maternity Flying Squad

Lecturer to Nurses and Red Cross Society

Acting Registrar in Obstetrics & Gynecology, Malacca General Hospital.Registrar, Department of Orthopedic & Traumatology

General Hospital Kuala Lumpur

1960 – Trainee Anaesthetic Medical Officer

1960–63 – Registrar, Orhopedic and Trauma Unit

Acting State Surgeon, Kuantan, on leave relief (2 Weeks)

General Practice

1963 – Private General Practice

1975 – In group practice

His professional memberships included the Royal College of Physicians in Edinburgh, the Royal College of General Practitioners, and the Royal Australian College of General Practitioners.

Personal life
Rajakumar was married to Ong Kik Hong and had three children: venture capitalist Datin Sunita Mei-Lin; Kiren Su-Lin in London; and Arjuna, a vice-president at HSBC Hong Kong. He also had one granddaughter.

Rajakumar's daughter Datin Sunita is married to the son of former senator Tan Sri Dr C. Sinnadurai. For the last two years of his life, he was cared for by his son-in-law Datuk Dr Jeyaindran Sinnadurai, the head of general medicine at Hospital Kuala Lumpur, and the deputy director general of health (medicine). He died on 22 November 2008 at 3am in Hospital Kuala Lumpur aged 76, from heart and lung complications following a bout of pneumonia.

Honorary awards
Award of 'Senior Fellow' of the Academy of Sciences Malaysia, designated "Academician",1999, under the Academy of Sciences Malaysia Act, 1994.

Fellow of the Malaysian Scientific Association, (1978)

Honorary Professor at the Capital Institute of Medicine Beijing, China, (1989)

Award of Honour, Chinese Medical Association (2003)

Senior Fellowship Award, Consortium of Thai Training Institutes for STD and AIDS (COTTISA 2004)

Principal Offices (as at 2008)

Honorary Medical Adviser, Tung Shin Charity Hospital

External Examiner for the Diploma in S.T.D. and AIDS, Prince Songkla University, Thailand

Senior Academic Advisor, Academy of Family Physicians of Malaysia, 2001–

President, International Society for the Study of Sexual Medicine, 2002–

President, Malaysian Medical Association (MMA) 1979–80.

Key reports and books

1. Curriculum for General Practice. Chairman, Report to the Council of the College of General Practitioners of Malaysia, September 1975.

2. Establishment of a Science Centre in Malaysia. Report to the Council of the Malaysian Scientific Association in May 1976.

3. Specialization in Primary Health Care – Training for the new General Practice in Malaysia, Chairman of Committee, College of General Practitioners of Malaysia, 1979.

4. Chairman, Committee on The Future of the Health Services in Malaysia. Report to Council of the Malaysian Medical Association, April 1980.

5. The Establishment of an Emergency Medical Response Unit of MASEAN. Report to the Council of the Medical Association of South-East Asian Nations, July 1983.

6. Report of a visit to Beijing, People's Republic of China to advice on Primary Health Care, May 1988, WONCA.

7. Chapter in "Principles and Practice of Primary Care and Family Medicine.Editors-John Fry and Nat Yuen 1994.

8. Chapter in "General Practice" edited by John Fry 1988.

Orations

4 Dec 1970 – Seminar organised by the Academic Staff Association, University of Malaya – Problems of Higher Education

11 June 1971 – Great Economic Debates organised by The Economics Society, University of Malaya – Dynamics of Social Change in the Rural Areas

26 Oct 1980 – 1st. William Pickles Lecture 1980, College of General Practitioners of Malaysia, Kuala Lumpur – Evolution of General Practice

15 April 1983 – Singapore Medical Association Annual Lecture, Singapore – Ethical Consequences of Technical Change

19 July 1986 – Tan Sri Danaraj Oration, organised by Alumni Association of the University of Malaya, Kuala Lumpur – Rethinking The Medical Curriculum

Aug 1993 – Takemi Oration, 18th Congress of the Confederation of Medical Associations in Asia and Oceania, Malacca, Malaysia – Health, the Environment and the Physician

1993 – Dr Sun Yat Sun Oration, Conferment Ceremony, The Hong Kong College of Practitioners, Hong Kong – Between Fate and Reason : The Quest of a Physician

13 February 1998 – Malaysian Medical Association Annual Oration in Seremban, Negeri Sembilan – The Practice of Medicine through the Ages and the Challenges Ahead

References

 Veteran socialist leader Dr Rajakumar dies, Martin Vengadesan, The Star, 22 November 2008.
 Dr Rajakumar – truly a patriot and people’s hero, Martin Vengadesan, The Star, 23 November 2008.
 PSM pays tribute to Dr MK Rajakumar (1932–2008), Socialist Party of Malaysia, 25 November 2008.

1932 births
2008 deaths
Malaysian politicians of Indian descent
Malaysian socialists
Malaysian general practitioners
Malaysian trade unionists
Labour Party of Malaya politicians
Deaths from pneumonia in Malaysia